Drew Hunter (born September 5, 1997) is an American middle distance runner from Purcellville, Virginia, who competes for professional running group Tinman Elite. He set the national indoor mile record for high school boys in 2016. He was named Gatorade National Cross-Country Runner of the Year in 2016. He committed to the University of Oregon on November 12, 2015 but instead decided to pursue a professional career by signing a 10-year contract with Adidas on July 8, 2016.

Running career

High school 
Hunter attended Loudoun Valley High School. He won the High School Boys 3000-meter race as a sophomore at the Penn Relays Carnival in 2014. He went on to set the national sophomore class record in the 3000 metres event at 8:16.31. In the fall of 2014, Hunter placed 4th at the Foot Locker Cross Country Championships. Hunter won the New Balance National Indoor two-mile national title in a time of 8:48.22. He started his outdoor season with a 4:07 victory at the Penn Relays, becoming the first high school athlete since Olympian Matt Centrowitz to own both the high school boys 3k and mile Penn Relays titles. Hunter achieved a season best of 4:02.36 at the Adidas Dream Mile at the Adidas Grand Prix. He broke Grant Fisher’s meet record at the Brooks PR 2-mile championship, where he set a personal best of 8:42.51 in the event. He ended his 2015 track season with a 2nd-place finish behind collegian Blake Haney in the junior boys 1500m at the USATF Outdoor Championships, closing the last 400 meters of that race in 53.10 seconds. Hunter set a personal best of 14:20 in the 5000 meters at the Third Battle Invitational. He set a course record of 14:26 at the Foot Locker South regional meet before winning his first Foot Locker National title in 14:55.7. In his indoor debut, Hunter broke the high school boys national indoor 3k record with a time of 7:59.33 at the Camel City Elite meet in Winston-Salem, North Carolina. He followed up that performance with another national record in the high school boys indoor mile, running 3:58.25 at the Armory Track and Field Invitational. In so doing, he became the 8th High School Athlete to break 4 minutes in the mile and the second high school athlete to break 4 indoors. Two weeks later, Hunter broke his own record, clocking 3:57.81 in the mile at the Millrose Games.
Hunter's 2016 outdoor season was also successful. He ran a 4:00.73 split in the 1600m to bring the Loudoun Valley boys the win in the DMR at the Penn Relays in 10:00.01. He returned to his best event, again breaking 4 minutes, running 3:58.86 at the Pre Classic.

Professional
In July 2016 Hunter signed a 10 year contract for Adidas. On August 5, 2016, he placed 6th overall in the men's mile race at the 2016 Sir Walter Miler, finishing in 3:57.15. It was his first race since graduating from high school. On February 11, 2017, Hunter participated in the NYRR Millrose Games Wanamaker Mile, where he placed seventh in 3:56.80. On February 23, 2019, Hunter won the USA Indoor Track & Field Championships two mile with a meet record time of 8:25.29. After suffering a series of injuries starting with a ruptured plantar fascia at the 2019 U.S. Track & Field Championships, Hunter did not compete in the 2020 USA Olympic Track & Field Trials. However, he returned to form later that year, winning the USA Road 5k Championships on November 6, 2021, in a time of 13:53.

Personal life
Hunter is the fourth of nine children in his family. Five of his siblings are adopted; two from Haiti and three from China. His father and mother are both also runners. His father, Marc Hunter, was a national-class distance runner for Cleveland State University, owner of a personal best of 13:36 for 5000 meters.  His mother, Joan Hunter ran at West Virginia University and has won multiple masters indoor national titles. Marc and Joan coached Alan Webb during his freshman year at South Lakes High School in Reston, Virginia.
Hunter is currently completing his undergraduate degree at University of Colorado Boulder.

Race results table

References

1997 births
Living people
American male long-distance runners
Sportspeople from Virginia
People from Purcellville, Virginia
USA Indoor Track and Field Championships winners